Sverre Lassen-Urdahl (17 February 1913 – 31 December 2005) was a Norwegian alpine skier, born in Lake Forest, Illinois, United States. He participated at the 1948 Winter Olympics in  Saint Moritz, where he competed in the downhill, tying 11th.

References

1913 births
2005 deaths
Sportspeople from Lake Forest, Illinois
Norwegian male alpine skiers
Olympic alpine skiers of Norway
Alpine skiers at the 1948 Winter Olympics